J. Ruiz station is an elevated Manila Light Rail Transit (LRT) station situated on Line 2. The station is located in San Juan and is named from its location on J. Ruiz Street.

J. Ruiz station is the fifth station for trains headed to Antipolo and the ninth station for trains headed to Recto. It is the only station in San Juan and is close to the borders of Quezon City before entering Manila.

It is named after Juan Ruiz, a Katipunero who took part in the siege of El Polvorin, where the Pinaglabanan Shrine is located. The station was part of the Phase II development of Line 2 together with the Betty Go-Belmonte station, Gilmore station, V. Mapa station, Pureza station and Legarda station.

Nearby landmarks

As the only station in San Juan, it serves the inner areas of the city including N. Domingo Street where the San Juan City Hall and San Juan Medical Center are located and Pinaglabanan district where Pinaglabanan Shrine and St. John the Baptist Church stand.

Transportation links
Buses, taxis, and jeepneys can be found at both gates of the station, while tricycles are available at the south gate.

See also
Manila Light Rail Transit System Line 2

References

Manila Light Rail Transit System stations
Railway stations opened in 2004
Buildings and structures in San Juan, Metro Manila